Clyde Reasinger (né Clyde Melvin Reasinger; 1927 – March 26, 2018) was an American trumpeter known for his work in big bands and recording studios.

Reasinger was born in Pennsylvania, and began his musical career in the late 1940s.  He later led his own big bands in recording studios, live venues, and reading/rehearsal bands.

Recording sessions 
Reasinger has jazz recording credits exceed 63 sessions with bands and artists that include:
 Jazz recording sessions

 Earle Spencer (1949)
 Dinah Washington with Ike Carpenter's Orchestra (1951)
 Stan Kenton (1952, 1967)
 Shorty Rogers: Shorty Rogers Courts the Count (RCA Victor, 1954)
 Sam Donahue (1955, 1957, 1958)
 Tommy Alexander (1956)
 Billy VerPlanck (1957)
 Dan Terry (1958)
 Maynard Ferguson: A Message from Newport (Roulette, 1958)
 Gil Evans (1958)
 Johnny Richards (1958, 1959)
 Boris Lindqvist, with the Bengt Arne Wallin Orchestra (1960)
 Quincy Jones (1960)
 Oliver Nelson (1961)
 Jackie Paris (1962)
 Henry Jerome and the Brazen Brass (1960)
 Joe Williams (1964, 1965)
 Dan Terry (mid 1960s)
 Ray Starling (1966)
 The New Glenn Miller Orchestra (1966)
 Charlie Barnet (1966, 1967)
 Nancy Wilson (1968)
 Harry James (1976, 1979)

 Pop & rock-n-roll recording sessions

 The Monkees (1968)

Selected filmography 
 The Cool Sound, DVD (2004) 
 Recorded 1959
 Miles Davis, John Coltrane, Wynton Kelly, Paul Chambers, Jimmy Cobb
 Gil Evans Orchestra, Ernie Royal, Clyde Reasinger, Louis Mucci, Johnny Coles, Emmett Berry (trumpets); Frank Rehak, Jimmy Cleveland, Bill Elton, Rod Levitt (trombones); Julius Watkins, Bob Northern (French horns); Bill Barber (tuba); Danny Bank (bass clarinet); Romeo Penque, Eddie Caine (woodwinds)

References 

1927 births
2018 deaths
American jazz trumpeters
American male trumpeters
Swing trumpeters
American jazz bandleaders
Jazz musicians from Pennsylvania
Place of birth missing
21st-century trumpeters
21st-century American male musicians
American male jazz musicians
Earle Spencer Orchestra members